The Asociación de Scouts de El Salvador (Scout Association of El Salvador) is the national Scouting organization of El Salvador. Scouting in El Salvador was founded in 1938 and became a member of the World Organization of the Scout Movement in 1940. The association has 2,820 members as of 2011.

The program emphasis is moral values, earth conservation, ecology and community service. The program is continually changed to adapt to the needs of the youth in the country. It has been co-ed since 1981.

Scouts are working to promote peace and have been involved with UNICEF on refugee projects. They worked with the Red Cross during many disasters, such as earthquakes and hurricanes.

Program and ideals

Lobatos/Cubs - ages 7 to 11
Scout - ages 11 to 15
Caminantes - ages 15 to 17
Founded on May 1, 2003, Caminantes (Walkers) are the newest branch, and try to give vent to the high school-age needs.
Rovers-ages 17 to 21

The Scout Motto is Siempre Listo, Always Prepared.
The membership badge of Asociación de Scouts de El Salvador is formed in the shape of a Cross of Saint James, the ends having a shape like a fleur-de-lis.

See also

 Asociación de Muchachas Guías de El Salvador

References

External links
 *

World Organization of the Scout Movement member organizations
Scouting and Guiding in El Salvador
Youth organizations established in 1938
1938 establishments in El Salvador